Inger Frimansson (born November 14, 1944 in Stockholm) is a popular Swedish novelist and crime writer.  Having previously worked for 30 years as a journalist, her first novel The Double Bed (Dubbelsängen) was published in 1984.  Since then she has written around twenty-five books including poetry, short stories, and books for children.  Her breakthrough was with Godnatt, min älskade in 1998.  Her crime novels are best described as psychological thrillers.

Translated works
2007 Good Night, My Darling (Godnatt, min älskade, 1998), translated by Laura A. Wideburg
2008 The Shadow in the Water (Skuggan i vattnet, 2005), translated by Laura A. Wideburg
2009 (forthcoming) The Island of Naked Women (De nakna kvinnornas ö, 2002), translated by Laura A. Wideburg

Awards
 1998 - Best Swedish Crime Novel Award for Godnatt, min älskade.
 2005 - Best Swedish Crime Novel Award for Skuggan i vattnet.
 2008 - Gold - Best Translated Book for Good Night, my Darling translated by Laura A. Wideburg by ForeWord Magazine

External links
 Author's website (Swedish)
 Author interview in English
 Review at International Noir blog

1944 births
Living people
Writers from Stockholm
Swedish women novelists
Swedish crime fiction writers
Women mystery writers
Swedish mystery writers